Events from the year 1904 in Canada.

Incumbents

Crown 
 Monarch – Edward VII

Federal government 
 Governor General – Gilbert Elliot-Murray-Kynynmound, 4th Earl of Minto (until December 10) then Albert Grey, 4th Earl Grey 
 Prime Minister – Wilfrid Laurier
 Chief Justice – Henri Elzéar Taschereau (Quebec)
 Parliament – 9th (until 29 September)

Provincial governments

Lieutenant governors 
Lieutenant Governor of British Columbia – Henri-Gustave Joly de Lotbinière  
Lieutenant Governor of Manitoba – Daniel Hunter McMillan
Lieutenant Governor of New Brunswick – Jabez Bunting Snowball 
Lieutenant Governor of Nova Scotia – Alfred Gilpin Jones    
Lieutenant Governor of Ontario – William Mortimer Clark 
Lieutenant Governor of Prince Edward Island – Peter A. McIntyre (until October 3) then Donald Alexander MacKinnon 
Lieutenant Governor of Quebec – Louis-Amable Jetté

Premiers 
Premier of British Columbia – Richard McBride  
Premier of Manitoba – Rodmond Roblin  
Premier of New Brunswick – Lemuel John Tweedie
Premier of Nova Scotia – George Henry Murray 
Premier of Ontario – George William Ross    
Premier of Prince Edward Island – Arthur Peters 
Premier of Quebec – Simon-Napoléon Parent

Territorial governments

Commissioners 
 Commissioner of Yukon – Frederick Tennyson Congdon (until October 29) then Zachary Taylor Wood (acting)

Lieutenant governors 
 Lieutenant Governor of Keewatin – Daniel Hunter McMillan
 Lieutenant Governor of the North-West Territories – Amédée E. Forget

Premiers 
 Premier of North-West Territories – Frederick Haultain

Events
April 8 – In the Lansdowne-Cambon Convention France gives up some of its longstanding rights in Newfoundland
 April 19 – The Great Toronto Fire destroys much of that city's downtown, but kills no one.
 June 24 – The North-West Mounted Police become the Royal Northwest Mounted Police
 September 10 – American criminal Bill Miner stages Canada's first-ever train robbery 
 October 8 – Edmonton is incorporated as a city of the North-West Territories.

Full date unknown
 Henry Ford opens an automobile manufacturing plant in Windsor, Ontario
 Assiniboine Park in Winnipeg opens

Births

January to June
January 4 – Pegi Nicol MacLeod, artist (d.1949)
January 14 – Walter Harris, politician and lawyer (d.1999)
February 29 – Lloyd Stinson, politician (d.1976)
March 6 – Farquhar Oliver, politician (d.1989)
March 26 – Gustave Biéler, Special Operations Executive agent during World War II (d.1944)
April 16 – Fifi D'Orsay, actress (d.1983)
April 26 – Paul-Émile Léger, Cardinal of the Roman Catholic Church (d.1991)
May 1 – Wally Downer, politician (d.1994)
May 13 – Earle Birney, poet (d.1995)

May 29 – Eugene Forsey, politician and constitutional expert (d.1991)
June 26 – Frank Scott Hogg, astrophysicist (d.1951)

July to December
July 22 – Donald O. Hebb, psychologist (d.1985)
August 15 – George Klein, inventor (d. 1992)
September 7 – Matthew Halton, radio and television journalist (d.1956)
September 14 – Frank Amyot, sprint canoer and Olympic gold medallist (d.1962)
September 23 – Geoffrey Waddington, conductor
September 29 – Robert Legget, civil engineer, historian and non-fiction writer (d.1994)
October 20 – Tommy Douglas, politician and Premier of Saskatchewan (d.1986)
November 18 – Jean Paul Lemieux, painter (d.1990)
November 26 – Armand Frappier, physician and microbiologist (d.1991)
December 18 – Wilf Carter, country music singer, songwriter, guitarist and yodeller (d.1996)
December 25 – Gerhard Herzberg, physicist and physical chemist (d.1999)
December 28 – Bobbie Rosenfeld, athlete and Olympic gold medallist (d.1969)
December 29 – Léo Gauthier, politician (d.1964)

Deaths
January 9 – Christian Kumpf, mayor of Waterloo, Ontario (b. 1838)
February 9 – Erastus Wiman, journalist and businessman (b.1834)
March 9 – Robert Machray, clergyman, missionary and first Primate of the Church of England in Canada (b.1831)
April 17 – Joseph Brunet, politician and businessman (b.1834)
May 11 – David Breakenridge Read, lawyer and 14th Mayor of Toronto (b. 1823)
August 8 – James Cox Aikins, politician, Minister and Lieutenant-Governor of Manitoba (b.1823)
August 31 – Jean-Baptiste Blanchet, politician (b.1842)
September 26 – John Fitzwilliam Stairs, entrepreneur and statesman (b.1848)

Historical documents
Great Toronto Fire and its aftermath, in eyewitness accounts and critical postmortem

Film of Great Toronto Fire

Photo of Toronto fire ruins

Anaconda, B.C. forest fire starts in "dry brush several feet thick" made of fallen trees amid much scrubby pine and fir killed by smelter smoke

Dubious story about people smuggling prompts editorial on journalistic accuracy

Burrowing owl increasing and Passenger pigeon disappearing in Manitoba

Manitoba Free Press special Christmas issue contains goose quill pen

References 

 
Years of the 20th century in Canada
1904 in North America